This is a list of all stations of the Kanpur Metro, a rapid transit system serving Kanpur of India.

Kanpur Metro is the 14th metro system in India.

The Kanpur metro as of now covers a distance of 8.98 km with 9 stations with all elevated.

It is built and operated by the Uttar Pradesh Metro Rail Corporation (UPMRC) . Its first section inaugurated on 28 December 2021 and opened for public on December 28, 2021, with the Orange Line. 

As of now, Kanpur Metro has 9 operational metro stations and remaining 20 stations are under construction.

Metro stations

Statistics

See also

Kochi Metro
Jaipur Metro
Mumbai Metro
Kolkata Metro

References

Kanpur Metro stations